Kristoffer Karlsson (born 1984) is a Swedish football referee. He became a professional referee in 2006, has been an Allsvenskan referee since 2012 and a full international referee for FIFA since 2018. Karlsson has refereed 146 matches in Allsvenskan, 57 matches in Superettan and 26 international matches as of 2019.

See also 

 List of football referees

References

External links 

 

1984 births
Living people
Swedish football referees